Arthur Michael Braun (July 18, 1910 – January 7, 1989) was an American politician and businessman.

Braun was born in Belgrade, Minnesota and went to schools in Badger, Minnesota. He lived in Greenbush, Minnesota with his wife and family and owned a garage in Greenbush. Braun was involved with the Greenbush Fire Department and served as mayor of Greenbush, Minnesota. Braun served in the Minnesota House of Representatives from 1973 to 1978 and was a Democrat., He died at the Abbott Northwestern Hospital in Minneapolis, Minnesota.

References

1910 births
1989 deaths
People from Roseau County, Minnesota
People from Stearns County, Minnesota
Businesspeople from Minnesota
Democratic Party members of the Minnesota House of Representatives